Peoria  may refer to:

Places

United States
 Peoria, Arizona, largest city in the U.S. with that name; named after Peoria, Illinois.
 Peoria, Colorado
 Peoria, Illinois
 Peoria, Franklin County, Indiana
 Peoria, Miami County, Indiana
 Peoria, Iowa
 Peoria, Kansas
 Peoria, Missouri
 Peoria, Ohio
 Peoria, Oklahoma
 Peoria County, Illinois
 Peoria Township (disambiguation)
 General Wayne A. Downing Peoria International Airport, often called simply Peoria International Airport

Music
 Peoria (album), a 2008 album by Future Clouds and Radar
 "Peoria", a song by King Crimson from their 1972 live album Earthbound

Other
 Peoria (moth), a genus of Pyralidae (pyralid moths)
 Peoria people, a Native American tribe
 USS Peoria, various ships

See also
 Peoria High School (disambiguation)
 List of places named Peoria
 Will it play in Peoria?